A Sip of What Is to Come EP is the debut EP by American alternative rock band DV8, which was recorded and released in June 2004.  It was produced by The Nixons frontman Zac Maloy. The release coincided with a three night stint at the Warped Tour on June 25–27, 2004.

All songs were written by lead singer Cash Kelley, except "Dumb Romantic", which was co-written with producer Zac Maloy. The final 'untitled' track is studio banter between the three band members.

Track listing

Personnel

DV8
  Cash Kelley – vocals, guitar
  John Cade – drums
  David Sposito – bass guitar,  vocals

Additional personnel
Zac Maloy – vocals
Mark Haugh – vocals
Kelly Kerr – photography

Production
All songs written by Cash Kelley, except Dumb Romantic written by Cash Kelley and Zac Maloy
Produced by Zac Maloy
Recorded at Yellow Dog Studios in Tulsa, Oklahoma, USA
Mixed by David Percefull and Zac Maloy
Art direction by Cash Kelley and Mark Haugh

References

External links
http://www.mtv.com/artists/dv8/discography/2552663/
http://www.allmusic.com/album/a-sip-of-what-is-to-come-mw0000187056

2004 EPs
Alternative rock EPs
Pop rock EPs
Punk rock EPs